Black Magic Tim (born Timothy Malcom Wilson) is an American filmmaker working mostly with music videos, EPK's, commercials and independent feature films. He has directed, filmed and edited productions for clients such as Blackground Records, Tommy Boy Entertainment and TVT Records. As well as, EPK's for national artists and book authors like " Naughty by Nature "," Tank (American singer) ", "Kimberly Scott (singer)" and Motivational Speaker "Valorie Burton". He has received several awards and film festival nominations for his work on the short Sci-Fi film "Apple Crumb Panic".

He is also known for reshaping the quality of Nollywood USA Films. His most notable Nollywood film Paparazzi: Eye in the Dark made a historical theatrical run in the United States where He served as cinematographer and editor. Wilson considers Nollywood to be the new black Hollywood. In 2013, the award-winning Nollywood feature, One Night in Vegas has also been poised as the next bar raising film  in which again, he was cinematographer and editor. As of 2014, the Nollywood film Busted Life was just released where again Wilson was Cinematographer.

He attended Howard University film school studying under Haile Gerima before starting his first film company in Washington, D.C. with 3 other Howard University graduates named "Black Magic Cinemaworks". He is skilled in 35mm, 16mm and HD Cinematography and is a visual digital effects technician.

He is now owner of a film production company named Cyberstorm Digital in Washington DC.

Filmography

Music videos

EPK's and commercials

Television

Nominations
 1993 RABC 9th Annual Film Festival: Best Short Film (Apple Crumb Panic)
 2005 EMMY AWARD: Jump Shot Your Vote feat Kenny Anderson
 2011 WMIFF: Best Cinematography in a Feature Film
 2011 WMIFF: Best Cinematography in a Music Video
 2011 NAFC Awards: Best Cinematography in the Diaspora 
 2011 GHANA MOVIE AWARDS: Best Sound Editing Paparazzi Eye In The Dark 
 2011 GHANA MOVIE AWARDS: Best Visual Effects Paparazzi Eye In The Dark
 2012 GIAMA AWARDS: Best Film Paparazzi Eye In The Dark 
 2012 Indie Music Channel Awards: World Music Video over $5000
 2013 NAFCA Awards: Best Sound "One Night in Vegas" 
 2013 NAFCA Awards: Best Editing "One Night in Vegas" 
 2013 NAFCA Awards: Best Cinematography in the Diaspora "One Night In Vegas"
 2013 NAFCA Awards: Best Cinematography "One Night In Vegas"
 2013 NAFCA Awards: Best Visual Effects "One Night In Vegas"
 2013 GHANA MOVIE AWARDS: Best Editing and Sound One Night In Vegas

Awards
 1993 ROSEBUD AWARDS: Honorable Mention for "Apple Crumb Panic"
 2011 WMIFF AWARD: Best Cinematography for "Paparazzi Eye In The Dark" 
 2011 NAFCA: Best Cinematography in the Diaspora "Paparazzi Eye In The Dark"
 2013 NAFCA: Best Cinematography "One Night In Vegas"

References

External links
 RVI Motion Media
 Vimeo Videos
 
 Paparazzi Eye In The Dark Official Site

African-American film directors
American film directors
Year of birth missing (living people)
Living people
Howard University alumni
21st-century African-American people